The Zangezur Copper and Molybdenum Combine, commonly known as ZCMC, is a mining industry enterprise in Armenia, based in the town of Kapan.

History 
The first geological excavations of Kajaran Mine in the Syunik Province took place in 1935. The construction of copper and molybdenum mine began in 1940, but was interrupted because of the World War II until 1944. The mine first started production in 1945, and has continued production to the present day.

After the independence of Armenia from the Soviet Union in the year 1991 the deep economic crisis seized also the Zangezur copper and molybdenum collective combined. It stood still until 1994.

In 2004 the combine was privatized and currently the owners are:  the CRONIMET Mining GmbH (60% of shares), “The Plant of Pure Iron” OJSC (15% of shares), Armenian Molybdenum Production Ltd. (12.5%) and Zangezur Mining Ltd (12.5%).

Since 2018 the owners are russian oligarch Roman Trotsenko 40%, Mikhail Zurabov 12.5%, Government of Armenia 27.5%, ex-president of Armenia Robert Kocharyan 15%, ZCMC 10%. 

ZCMC are the owners and the shirt sponsors of FC Gandzasar Kapan, a professional football club from the town of Kapan, Armenia.

References

External links 
 Official website

Companies of Armenia
Mining companies of the Soviet Union
Mining in Armenia